The Paton-Churdan Community School District is a rural public school district headquartered in Churdan, Iowa. The district is in Greene County and serves Churdan and Paton.

Paton-Churdan has roughly 204 students in grades K to 12 taught in one building in Churdan.

The Rockets is the team name, and there is a statue of a rocket in the front lawn.


Schools

Paton-Churdan Elementary School 
The elementary school serves about 70 students in grades Pre-K to 5.

Paton-Churdan Junior-Senior High School 
The high school serves about 80 students in grades 6 to 12.

The Class of 2005 graduated with 8 students.  There were four men and four women, thus they were the homecoming court.

Currently, Paton-Churdan high school students attend classes at Greene County High School (formerly Jefferson-Scranton High School) of the Greene County Community School District for about half of the day.

Paton-Churdan High School

Athletics
The Rockets compete in the Rolling Valley Conference in the following sports:

Baseball
Basketball (boys and girls)
Cross Country (boys and girls)
Football
 2-time Class A State Champions (1985, 1986)>
Softball
Track and Field (boys and girls)
 Boys' - 1986 Class 1A State Champions
Volleyball
Wrestling

See also
List of school districts in Iowa
List of high schools in Iowa

References 
Notes

Bibliography
About Paton Churdan. Paton-Churdan Comm. School District. Retrieved on 2008-02-03.

School districts established in 1962
1962 establishments in Iowa
Education in Greene County, Iowa
School districts in Iowa